The 2012–13 Welsh Alliance League, known as the Lock Stock Welsh Alliance League for sponsorship reasons, is the 29th season of the Welsh Alliance League, which consists of two divisions: the third and fourth levels of the Welsh football pyramid.

There are fifteen teams in Division 1 and thirteen teams in Division 2, with the champions of Division 1 promoted to the Cymru Alliance and the bottom team relegated to Division 2. In Division 2, the champions, and runners-up are promoted to Division 1.

The season began on 10 August 2012 and concluded on 11 May 2013 with Caernarfon Town as Division 1 champions and Llangefni Town relegated to Division 2. In Division 2, Llandyrnog United were champions with Llanfairpwll as runners-up.

Division 1

Teams 
Holyhead Hotspur were champions in the previous season and were promoted to the Cymru Alliance. They were replaced by Llangefni Town who were relegated from the Cymru Alliance.

Llanfairpwll and Caernarfon Wanderers were relegated and replaced by Division 2 champions, Glantraeth and runners-up, Llanberis, who were promoted to Division 1.

Grounds and locations

League table

Results

Division 2

Teams 
Glantraeth were champions in the previous season and were promoted to Division 1 along with runners-up, Llanberis. They were replaced by Gwynedd League champions, Penrhyndeudraeth and Vale of Clwyd and Conwy Football League runners-up, Meliden who were promoted to Division 2.

Grounds and locations

League table

Results

References

External links
 Welsh Alliance League

Welsh Alliance League seasons
3
Wales